Markus Blutsch (born 1 June 1995) is an Austrian footballer who plays for SPG Pregarten.

Honours
Pasching
Austrian Cup: 2012–13

References

External links
Markus Blutsch at ÖFB

Austrian footballers
Austrian Football Bundesliga players
2. Liga (Austria) players
Austrian Regionalliga players
1995 births
Living people
FC Admira Wacker Mödling players
FC Juniors OÖ players
LASK players
FC Blau-Weiß Linz players
Association football midfielders